Edison Toloza Colorado (born 15 June 1984) is a Colombian footballer who plays as winger for Correcaminos UAT.

One of the most skillful and fast forwards in the domestic league, his great speed is his best argument to face the rival defenses. Player of great mobility, power and speed in short passages, always succeeding to score goals from any position. Commonly nicknamed by the football fans as Tolotelli due to his resemblance in personality to Mario Balotelli.

Career

Jaguares de Córdoba
On 6 September 2019 it was confirmed, that Toloza had joined Jaguares de Córdoba. However, it was announced on 29 September 2019, that he had left the club again.

References

External links
 
 

1984 births
Living people
Colombian footballers
Colombian expatriate footballers
Association football forwards
Deportivo Pereira footballers
Deportes Quindío footballers
Independiente Santa Fe footballers
América de Cali footballers
Millonarios F.C. players
Atlético Morelia players
Club Puebla players
Atlético Junior footballers
Jiangsu F.C. players
Independiente Medellín footballers
Deportivo Pasto footballers
Águilas Doradas Rionegro players
Correcaminos UAT footballers
Jaguares de Córdoba footballers
Categoría Primera A players
Liga MX players
Ascenso MX players
Colombian expatriate sportspeople in Mexico
Colombian expatriate sportspeople in China
Expatriate footballers in Mexico
Expatriate footballers in China
Chinese Super League players
Sportspeople from Nariño Department